The Registry of Marriages (ROM) is a government agency in Singapore that administers all marriages carried out in the country and solemnises civil marriages.

Overview
Marriage records in Singapore date back to the year 1875. On 15 September 1961, Civil Marriages came into force under the legislation. The Registry was established at the same time. ROM was originally located in Fort Canning Park, opposite Park Mall Shopping Centre, but moved in 1983 to its current premises at Canning Rise.

The Registry of Marriages keeps a record of all couples married in Singapore and issues the official marriage certificate after solemnisation. Part of the mission of ROM is to administer the Women Charter Act in civil marriages. ROM is an agency of the Ministry of Community Development, Youth and Sports.

References

External links
Official Website

Organisations of the Singapore Government
Marriage, unions and partnerships in Singapore